The Rucker House, also known as the Caretaker's House is a historic house at Benton and School Streets in Bauxite, Arkansas.  It is a vernacular two-story wood-frame structure, with a side gable central section that has a cross-gable section at the western end, and a second wing extending northward from the eastern end.  A porch extends across the front as far as the cross-gable section, with a shed roof supported by simple posts.  The house was built in 1905 by the Pittsburgh Reduction Company, a predecessor of Alcoa, whose bauxite mining business dominated the local economy.

The house was listed on the National Register of Historic Places in 1988. It was deemed important as the only surviving, intact house of the original Bauxite, a company town that was established in 1903.  It was home of the company's plant supervisor, W. A. Rucker.

See also
National Register of Historic Places listings in Saline County, Arkansas

References

Houses on the National Register of Historic Places in Arkansas
Houses completed in 1905
Houses in Saline County, Arkansas
National Register of Historic Places in Saline County, Arkansas
Bauxite, Arkansas
1905 establishments in Arkansas
Alcoa
Bauxite mining
Company housing